Senate elections were held in Greece on 21 April 1929. The Senate was a new institution introduced with the Greek Constitution of 1927 and these were the first elections for it. The result was a victory for the Liberal Party, which won 64 of the 92 directly-elected seats. It was regarded as a public approval of the policies of Prime Minister Eleftherios Venizelos.

Results

References

Parliamentary elections in Greece
Greece
1929 in Greece
1920s in Greek politics
Eleftherios Venizelos
Election 1929
History of Greece (1924–1941)
Greece
Election and referendum articles with incomplete results